Lepidochrysops albilinea is a butterfly in the family Lycaenidae. It is found in South Sudan.

The length of the forewings is about 17 mm. The upperside of the wings is greyish blue with a tinge of mauve. The lower part of the costa is silvery blue due to long ribbon-like transparent scales.

References

External links
 

Butterflies described in 1959
Butterflies of Africa
Endemic fauna of South Sudan
Lepidochrysops